Santa Lucía Monteverde  is a town and municipality in Oaxaca in south-western Mexico. The municipality covers an area of  km². 
It is part of Putla District in the west of the Sierra Sur Region.

As of 2020, the municipality had a total population of 4990.

References

Municipalities of Oaxaca